Giuseppe Cassanti (born 17 July 1898, date of death unknown) was an Italian racing cyclist. He rode in the 1924 Tour de France.

References

External links
 

1898 births
Year of death missing
Italian male cyclists
Place of birth missing